Henriette Fröschl (born 14 August 1959) is a German ice dancer. She competed in the ice dance event at the 1980 Winter Olympics.

References

1959 births
Living people
German female ice dancers
Olympic figure skaters of West Germany
Figure skaters at the 1980 Winter Olympics
Sportspeople from Munich